Joaquín Rivera Bragas (July 25, 1795, Tegucigalpa, Honduras - February 6, 1845, Comayagua, Honduras) was a Honduran politician and military leader who served as the Head of the State of Honduras under the Federal Republic of Central America from 7 January 1833 - 31 December 1836. He served for approximately four years, as was planned, after popular elections for the office were held and he was inaugurated. His Vice-Supreme Leader (Vice-Jefe) was Francisco Ferrera. His period of rule was marked by peace and unity with the other states in the Federal Republic.

See also 

 List of presidents of Honduras
 Jose Francisco Milla Guevara
 José María Martinez Salinas

References 

1796 births
1845 deaths
People executed by Honduras by firing squad
Honduran military personnel
Executed military personnel
Honduran politicians